Big Science is the fourth studio album by BWO. It was released on April 1, 2009. It peaked at number 9 on the Swedish Albums Chart.

In the UK, the album was released on October 5, 2009.

Track listing

Charts

References

External links
 

2009 albums
BWO (band) albums